Prairie Township is a township in Wilson County, Kansas, in the United States.

History
Prairie Township was established in 1872. It was named from its setting upon the prairie.

References

Townships in Wilson County, Kansas
Townships in Kansas